Marion Parris Smith (1879–?) was a professor of economics at Bryn Mawr College.

Biography
She was born as Marion Parris on 22 May 1879 in Manhattan to Edward Lowden Parris (1837–1921) and Mary Ida Dubois (1850–1936)

She married William Roy Smith (1876–1938) on 11 June 1912 in Manhattan, New York.

In 1936 she was named to the Pennsylvania Education Board by George Howard Earle III.

Works
 Millinery as a Trade for Women. With Lorinda Perry (1916) 
 Chinese Optimism: A nature-philosophy that led to faith in human goodness and inspired serene art. (1924)
 What constitutes a liberal democracy? (1925)
 A Democratic Program: Address before the Democratic Women's Luncheon Club of Philadelphia. (1926)
 Recent Economic Heresies: Address before the Executive Committee of the Democratic Women's Luncheon Club of Philadelphia. (1935)

References 

1879 births
Year of death missing
Bryn Mawr College faculty
20th-century American economists
American women economists
Economists from New York (state)
20th-century American women
People from Manhattan